Anthony Ivan Tuggle (born September 13, 1963) is a former professional American football defensive back in the National Football League for the Pittsburgh Steelers in 1985 and 1987. Tuggle was drafted in the fourth round of the 1985 NFL Draft by the Cincinnati Bengals. He was also a fifth round (64th overall) selection of the Los Angeles Express in the 1985 USFL Draft.

Tuggle began his college football career at Southern University before transferring to Nicholls State University. He played high school football at Baker High School in Baker, Louisiana.

References
 Nicholls State Colonels media guide

External links
Nicholls State bio
NFL bio

1963 births
Living people
Players of American football from Baton Rouge, Louisiana
American football defensive backs
Pittsburgh Steelers players
Southern Jaguars football players
Nicholls Colonels football players